Christopher Kalongo (born January 7, 2002) is a Canadian professional soccer player who plays as a goalkeeper with Forge FC in the Canadian Premier League.

Early life
He played youth soccer with the Milton Youth SC. He later joined the youth system of Sigma FC.

Club career
In 2021, Kalongo played in League1 Ontario with Sigma FC.

In September 2021, he joined Forge FC of the Canadian Premier League on a developmental contract. In February 2022, he signed a standard contract with Forge. He made his debut on April 10, 2022, against Pacific FC. He won the CPL title with Forge in 2022. In March 2023, he re-signed with the club for another season.

Honours

Club
Forge FC
Canadian Premier League: 2022

References

External links
 

2002 births
Living people
Association football goalkeepers
Canadian soccer players
Forge FC players
League1 Ontario players
Canadian Premier League players
Sigma FC players
Sportspeople from Oakville, Ontario